The brit milah ( bərīṯ mīlā, ; Ashkenazi pronunciation: , "covenant of circumcision"; Yiddish pronunciation: bris ) is the ceremony of circumcision in Judaism. According to the Book of Genesis, God commanded the biblical patriarch Abraham to be circumcised, an act to be followed by his male descendants on the eighth day of life, symbolizing the covenant between God and the Jewish people. Today, it is generally performed by a mohel on the eighth day after the infant's birth and is followed by a celebratory meal known as seudat mitzvah.

Brit Milah is considered among the most important and central commandments in Judaism, and the rite has played a central role in the formation and history of Jewish civilization. The Talmud, when discussing the importance of Brit Milah, compares it to being equal to all other mitzvot (commandments) based on the gematria for brit of 612. Jews who voluntarily fail to undergo Brit Milah, barring extraordinary circumstances, are believed to suffer Kareth in Jewish theology: the extinction of the soul and denial of a share in the world to come. Judaism does not see circumcision as a universal moral law. Rather, the commandment is exclusive to followers of Judaism and the Jewish people; Gentiles who follow the Noahide Laws are believed to have a portion in the World to Come.

Conflicts between Jews and European civilizations (both Christian and Pagan) have occurred several times over Brit Milah. There have been multiple campaigns of Jewish ethnic, cultural, and religious persecution over the subject, with subsequent bans and restrictions on the practice as an attempted means of forceful assimilation, conversion, and ethnocide, most famously in the Maccabean Revolt by the Seleucid Empire. According to historian Michael Livingston, "In Jewish history, the banning of circumcision (brit mila) has historically been a first step toward more extreme and violent forms of persecution". These periods have generally been linked to suppression of Jewish religious, ethnic, and cultural identity and subsequent "punishment at the hands of government authorities for engaging in circumcision". The Maccabee victory in the Maccabean Revolt — ending the prohibition against circumcision — is celebrated in Hanukkah.

Circumcision rates are near-universal among Jews.

Origins (Unknown to 515 BCE) 

The origin of circumcision is not known with certainty; however, artistic and literary evidence from ancient Egypt suggests it was practiced in the ancient Near East from at least the Sixth Dynasty (ca. 2345–ca. 2181 BCE). According to some scholars, it appears that it only appeared as a sign of the covenant during the Babylonian Exile. Scholars who posit the existence of a hypothetical J source (likely composed during the seventh century BCE) of the Pentateuch in Genesis 15 hold that it would not have mentioned a covenant that involves the practice of circumcision. Only in the P source (likely composed during the sixth century BCE) of Genesis 17 does the notion of circumcision become linked to a covenant.

Some scholars have argued that it originated as a replacement for child sacrifice.

Biblical references 

According to the Hebrew Bible, Adonai commanded the biblical patriarch Abraham to be circumcised, an act to be followed by his descendants:

Leviticus 12:3 says: "And in the eighth day the flesh of his foreskin shall be circumcised."

According to the Hebrew Bible, it was "a reproach" for an Israelite to be uncircumcised. The word  ("uncircumcised" [singular]) is also employed for "impermeable"; it is also applied to the first three years' fruit of a tree, which is forbidden.

However, the Israelites born in the wilderness after the Exodus from Egypt were not circumcised. Joshua 5:2–9, explains, "all the people that came out" of Egypt were circumcised, but those "born in the wilderness" were not. Therefore, Joshua, before the celebration of the Passover, had them circumcised at Gilgal specifically before they entered Canaan. Abraham, too, was circumcised when he moved into Canaan.

The prophetic tradition emphasizes that God expects people to be good as well as pious, and that non-Jews will be judged based on their ethical behavior, see Noahide Law. Thus, Jeremiah 9:25–26 says that circumcised and uncircumcised will be punished alike by the Lord; for "all the nations are uncircumcised, and all the house of Israel are uncircumcised in heart."

The penalty of willful non-observance is kareth (making oneself liable to extirpation), as noted in Genesis 17:1-14. Conversion to Judaism for non-Israelites in Biblical times necessitated circumcision, otherwise one could not partake in the Passover offering. Today, as in the time of Abraham, it is required of converts in Orthodox, Conservative and Reform Judaism.

As found in Genesis 17:1–14, brit milah is considered to be so important that should the eighth day fall on the Sabbath, actions that would normally be forbidden because of the sanctity of the day are permitted in order to fulfill the requirement to circumcise. The Talmud, when discussing the importance of Milah, compares it to being equal to all other mitzvot (commandments) based on the gematria for brit of 612.

Covenants in ancient times were sometimes sealed by severing an animal, with the implication that the party who breaks the covenant will suffer a similar fate. In Hebrew, the verb meaning "to seal a covenant" translates literally as "to cut". It is presumed by Jewish scholars that the removal of the foreskin symbolically represents such a sealing of the covenant.

Ceremony

Mohel 
A mohel is a Jew trained in the practice of brit milah, the "covenant of circumcision." According to traditional Jewish law, in the absence of a grown free Jewish male expert, anyone who has the required skills is also authorized to perform the circumcision, if they are Jewish. In 1984, Deborah Cohen became the first certified Reform ; she was certified by the Berit Mila program of Reform Judaism.

Time and place 

It is customary for the brit to be held in a synagogue, but it can also be held at home or any other suitable location. The brit is performed on the eighth day from the baby's birth, taking into consideration that according to the Jewish calendar, the day begins at the sunset of the day before. If the baby is born on Sunday before sunset, the brit will be held the following Sunday. However, if the baby is born on Sunday night after sunset, the brit is on the following Monday. The brit takes place on the eighth day following birth even if that day is Shabbat or a holiday. A brit is traditionally performed in the morning, but it may be performed any time during daylight hours.

Postponement for health reasons 

The Talmud explicitly instructs that a boy must not be circumcised if he had two brothers who died due to complications arising from their circumcisions, and Maimonides says that this excluded paternal half-brothers. This may be due to a concern about hemophilia.

An Israeli study found a high rate of urinary tract infections if the bandage is left on too long.

If the child is born prematurely or has other serious medical problems, the brit milah will be postponed until the doctors and mohel deem the child strong enough for his foreskin to be surgically removed.

Adult circumcision 
In recent years, the circumcision of adult Jews who were not circumcised as infants has become more common than previously thought. In such cases, the brit milah will be done at the earliest date that can be arranged. The actual circumcision will be private, and other elements of the ceremony (e.g., the celebratory meal) may be modified to accommodate the desires of the one being circumcised.

Circumcision for the dead 
According to Halacha, a baby who dies before they had time to circumcise him must be circumcised before burial. Several reasons were given for this commandment. Some have written that there is no need for this circumcision.

Anesthetic 
Most prominent acharonim rule that the mitzvah of brit milah lies in the pain it causes, and anesthetic, sedation, or ointment should generally not be used. However, it is traditionally common to feed the infant a drop of wine or other sweet liquid to soothe him.

Eliezer Waldenberg, Yechiel Yaakov Weinberg, Shmuel Wosner, Moshe Feinstein and others agree that the child should not be sedated, although pain relieving ointment may be used under certain conditions; Shmuel Wosner particularly asserts that the act ought to be painful, per Psalms 44:23.

In a letter to the editor published in The New York Times on January 3, 1998, Rabbi Moshe David Tendler disagrees with the above and writes, "It is a biblical prohibition to cause anyone unnecessary pain". Rabbi Tendler recommends the use of an analgesic cream. Lidocaine should not be used, however, because lidocaine has been linked to several pediatric near-death episodes.

Kvatter 
The title of kvater among Ashkenazi Jews is for the person who carries the baby from the mother to the father, who in turn carries him to the mohel. This honor is usually given to a couple without children, as a merit or segula (efficacious remedy) that they should have children of their own. The origin of the term is Middle High German gevater/gevatere ("godfather").

Seudat mitzvah 
After the ceremony, a celebratory meal takes place. At the birkat hamazon, additional introductory lines, known as Nodeh Leshimcha, are added. These lines praise God and request the permission of God, the Torah, Kohanim and distinguished people present to proceed with the grace. When the four main blessings are concluded, special ha-Rachaman prayers are recited. They request various blessings by God that include:
 the parents of the baby, to help them raise him wisely;
 the sandek (companion of child);
 the baby boy to have strength and grow up to trust in God and perceive Him three times a year;
 the mohel for unhesitatingly performing the ritual;
 to send the Messiah in Judaism speedily in the merit of this mitzvah;
 to send Elijah the prophet, known as "The Righteous Kohen", so that God's covenant can be fulfilled with the re-establishment of the throne of King David.

Ritual components

Uncovering, priah 

At the neonatal stage, the inner preputial epithelium is still linked with the surface of the glans.
The mitzvah is executed only when this epithelium is either removed, or permanently peeled back to uncover the glans.
On medical circumcisions performed by surgeons, the epithelium is removed along with the foreskin, to prevent post operative penile adhesion and its complications.
However, on ritual circumcisions performed by a mohel, the epithelium is most commonly peeled off only after the foreskin has been amputated. This procedure is called priah, which means: 'uncovering'. The main goal of "priah" (also known as "bris periah"), is to remove as much of the inner layer of the foreskin as possible and prevent the movement of the shaft skin, what creates the look and function of what is known as a "low and tight" circumcision.

According to Rabbinic interpretation of traditional Jewish sources, the 'priah' has been performed as part of the Jewish circumcision since the Israelites first inhabited the Land of Israel.

The Oxford Dictionary of the Jewish Religion states that many Hellenistic Jews attempted to restore their foreskins, and that similar action was taken during the Hadrianic persecution, a period in which a prohibition against circumcision was issued. The writers of the dictionary hypothesize that the more severe method practiced today was probably begun in order to prevent the possibility of restoring the foreskin after circumcision, and therefore the rabbis added the requirement of cutting the foreskin in periah.

According to Shaye J. D. Cohen, the Torah only commands milah. David Gollaher has written that the rabbis added the procedure of priah to discourage men from trying to restore their foreskins: "Once established, priah was deemed essential to circumcision; if the mohel failed to cut away enough tissue, the operation was deemed insufficient to comply with God's covenant," and "Depending on the strictness of individual rabbis, boys (or men thought to have been inadequately cut) were subjected to additional operations."

note: alternate spellings Metzizah or Metsitsah are also used to refer to this.

In the Metzitzah, the guard is slid over the foreskin as close to the glans as possible to allow for maximum removal of the former without any injury to the latter.  A scalpel is used to detach the foreskin.  A tube is used for metzitzah
The Talmud writes that a "Mohel (Circumciser) who does not suck creates a danger, and should be dismissed from practice". Rashi on that Talmudic passage explains that this step is in order to draw some blood from deep inside the wound to prevent danger to the baby.
There are other modern antiseptic and antibiotic techniques—all used as part of the brit milah today—which many say accomplish the intended purpose of metzitzah, however, since metzitzah is one of the four steps to fulfill Mitzvah, it continues to be practiced by a minority of Orthodox and Hassidic Jews.

(oral suction) 
This has also been abbreviated as MBP.
The ancient method of performing metzitzah b'peh—or oral suction—has become controversial. The process has the mohel place his mouth directly on the infant's genital wound to draw blood away from the cut. The vast majority of Jewish circumcision ceremonies do not use metzitzah b'peh, but some Haredi Jews continue to use it. It has been documented that the practice poses a serious risk of spreading herpes to the infant. Proponents maintain that there is no conclusive evidence that links herpes to Metzitza, and that attempts to limit this practice infringe on religious freedom.

The practice has become a controversy in both secular and Jewish medical ethics. The ritual of metzitzah is found in Mishnah Shabbat 19:2, which lists it as one of the four steps involved in the circumcision rite. Rabbi Moses Sofer, also known as the Chatam Sofer (1762–1839), observed that the Talmud states that the rationale for this part of the ritual was hygienic — i.e., to protect the health of the child.  The Chatam Sofer issued a leniency (Heter) that some consider to have been conditional, to perform metzitzah with a sponge to be used instead of oral suction in a letter to his student, Rabbi Lazar Horowitz of Vienna. This letter was never published among Rabbi Sofer's responsa but rather in the secular journal Kochvei Yitzchok. along with letters from Dr. Wertheimer, the chief doctor of the Viennese General Hospital. It relates the story that a mohel (who was suspected of transmitting herpes via metzizah to infants) was checked several times and never found to have signs of the disease and that a ban was requested because of the "possibility of future infections". Moshe Schick (1807–1879), a student of Moses Sofer, states in his book of Responsa, She’eilos u’teshuvos Maharam Schick (Orach Chaim 152,) that Moses Sofer gave the ruling in that specific instance only because the mohel refused to step down and had secular government connections that prevented his removal in favor of another mohel, and the Heter may not be applied elsewhere. He also states (Yoreh Deah 244) that the practice is possibly a Sinaitic tradition, i.e., Halacha l'Moshe m'Sinai. Other sources contradict this claim, with copies of Moses Sofer's responsa making no mention of the legal case or of his ruling applying in only one situation. Rather, that responsa makes quite clear that "metzizah" was a health measure and should never be employed where there is a health risk to the infant.

Chaim Hezekiah Medini, after corresponding with the greatest Jewish sages of the generation, concluded the practice to be Halacha l'Moshe m'Sinai and elaborates on what prompted Moses Sofer to give the above ruling. He tells the story that a student of Moses Sofer, Lazar Horowitz, Chief Rabbi of Vienna at the time and author of the responsa Yad Elazer, needed the ruling because of a governmental attempt to ban circumcision completely if it included metztitzah b'peh. He therefore asked Sofer to give him permission to do brit milah without metzitzah b’peh. When he presented the defense in secular court, his testimony was erroneously recorded to mean that Sofer stated it as a general ruling. The Rabbinical Council of America (RCA), which claims to be the largest American organization of Orthodox rabbis, published an article by mohel Dr Yehudi Pesach Shields in its summer 1972 issue of Tradition magazine, calling for the abandonment of Metzitzah b'peh. Since then the RCA has issued an opinion that advocates methods that do not involve contact between the mohel's mouth and the infant's genitals, such as the use of a sterile syringe, thereby eliminating the risk of infection. According to the Chief Rabbinate of Israel and the Edah HaChareidis metzitzah b'peh should still be performed.

The practice of metzitzah b'peh posed a serious risk in the transfer of herpes from mohelim to eight Israeli infants, one of whom suffered brain damage. When three New York City infants contracted herpes after metzizah b'peh by one mohel and one of them died, New York authorities took out a restraining order against the mohel requiring use of a sterile glass tube, or pipette. The mohel's attorney argued that the New York Department of Health had not supplied conclusive medical evidence linking his client with the disease. In September 2005, the city withdrew the restraining order and turned the matter over to a rabbinical court. Dr. Thomas Frieden, the Health Commissioner of New York City, wrote, "There exists no reasonable doubt that ‘metzitzah b'peh’ can and has caused neonatal herpes infection....The Health Department recommends that infants being circumcised not undergo metzitzah b'peh." In May 2006, the Department of Health for New York State issued a protocol for the performance of metzitzah b'peh. Dr. Antonia C. Novello, Commissioner of Health for New York State, together with a board of rabbis and doctors, worked, she said,  to "allow the practice of metzizah b'peh to continue while still meeting the Department of Health's responsibility to protect the public health." Later in New York City in 2012 a 2-week-old baby died of herpes because of metzitzah b'peh.

In three medical papers done in Israel, Canada, and the US, oral suction following circumcision was suggested as a cause in 11 cases of neonatal herpes. Researchers noted that prior to 1997, neonatal herpes reports in Israel were rare, and that the late incidences were correlated with the mothers carrying the virus themselves. Rabbi Doctor Mordechai Halperin implicates the "better hygiene and living conditions that prevail among the younger generation," which lowered to 60% the rate of young Israeli Chareidi mothers who carry the virus. He explains that an "absence of antibodies in the mothers’ blood means that their newborn sons received no such antibodies through the placenta, and therefore are vulnerable to infection by HSV-1."

Barriers 
Because of the risk of infection, some rabbinical authorities have ruled that the traditional practice of direct contact should be replaced by using a sterile tube between the wound and the mohel's mouth, so there is no direct oral contact. The Rabbinical Council of America, the largest group of Modern Orthodox rabbis, endorses this method.  The RCA paper states: "Rabbi Schachter even reports that Rav Yosef Dov Soloveitchik reports that his father, Rav Moshe Soloveitchik, would not permit a mohel to perform metzitza be’peh with direct oral contact, and that his grandfather, Rav Chaim Soloveitchik, instructed mohelim in Brisk not to do metzitza be’peh with direct oral contact. However, although Rav Yosef Dov Soloveitchik also generally prohibited metzitza be’peh with direct oral contact, he did not ban it by those who insisted upon it." The sefer Mitzvas Hametzitzah by Rabbi Sinai Schiffer of Baden, Germany, states that he is in possession of letters from 36 major Russian (Lithuanian) rabbis that categorically prohibit Metzitzah with a sponge and require it to be done orally. Among them is Rabbi Chaim Halevi Soloveitchik of Brisk.

In September 2012, the New York Department of Health unanimously ruled that the practice of metztizah b'peh should require informed consent from the parent or guardian of the child undergoing the ritual. Prior to the ruling, several hundred rabbis, including Rabbi David Neiderman, the executive director of the United Jewish Organization of Williamsburg, signed a declaration stating that they would not inform parents of the potential dangers that came with metzitzah b'peh, even if informed consent became law.

In a motion for preliminary injunction with intent to sue, filed against New York City Department of Health & Mental Hygiene, affidavits by Awi Federgruen, Brenda Breuer, and Daniel S. Berman argued that the study on which the department passed its conclusions is flawed.

The "informed consent" regulation was challenged in court. In January 2013 the U.S. District court ruled that the law did not specifically target religion and therefore must not pass strict scrutiny. The ruling was appealed to the Court of Appeals.

On August 15, 2014, the Second Circuit Court of Appeals reversed the decision by the lower court, and ruled that the regulation does have to be reviewed under strict scrutiny to determine whether it infringes on Orthodox Jews' freedom of religion.

On September 9, 2015, after coming to an agreement with the community The New York City Board of Health voted to repeal the informed consent regulation.

Hatafat dam brit 
A brit milah is more than circumcision; it is a sacred ritual in Judaism, as distinguished from its non-ritual requirement in Islam. One ramification is that the brit is not considered complete unless a drop of blood is actually drawn. The standard medical methods of circumcision through constriction do not meet the requirements of the halakhah for brit milah, because they are done with hemostasis, i.e., they stop the flow of blood. Moreover, circumcision alone, in the absence of the brit milah ceremony, does not fulfill the requirements of the mitzvah. Therefore, in cases involving a Jew who was circumcised outside of a brit milah, an already-circumcised convert, or an aposthetic (born without a foreskin) individual, the mohel draws a symbolic drop of blood from the penis at the point where the foreskin would have been or was attached.

Milah L'shem Giur 

A milah l'shem giur is a "circumcision for the purpose of conversion". In Orthodox Judaism, this procedure is usually done by adoptive parents for adopted boys who are being converted as part of the adoption or by families with young children converting together. It is also required for adult converts who were not previously circumcised, e.g., those born in countries where circumcision at birth is not common. The conversion of a minor is valid in both Orthodox and Conservative Judaism until a child reaches the age of majority (13 for a boy, 12 for a girl); at that time the child has the option of renouncing his conversion and Judaism, and the conversion will then be considered retroactively invalid. He must be informed of his right to renounce his conversion if he wishes. If he does not make such a statement, it is accepted that the boy is halakhically Jewish. Orthodox rabbis will generally not convert a non-Jewish child raised by a mother who has not converted to Judaism.

The laws of conversion and conversion-related circumcision in Orthodox Judaism have numerous complications, and authorities recommend that a rabbi be consulted well in advance.

In Conservative Judaism, the milah l'shem giur procedure is also performed for a boy whose mother has not converted, but with the intention that the child be raised Jewish.  This conversion of a child to Judaism without the conversion of the mother is allowed by Conservative interpretations of halakha. Conservative Rabbis will authorize it only under the condition that the child be raised as a Jew in a single-faith household. Should the mother convert, and if the boy has not yet reached his third birthday, the child may be immersed in the mikveh with the mother, after the mother has already immersed, to become Jewish.  If the mother does not convert, the child may be immersed in a mikveh, or body of natural waters, to complete the child's conversion to Judaism. This can be done before the child is even one year old. If the child did not immerse in the mikveh, or the boy was too old, then the child may choose of their own accord to become Jewish at age 13 as a Bar Mitzvah, and complete the conversion then.
 The ceremony, when performed l'shem giur, does not have to be performed on a particular day, and does not override Shabbat and Jewish Holidays.
 In Orthodox Judaism, there is a split of authorities on whether the child receives a Hebrew name at the Brit ceremony or upon immersion in the Mikvah. According to Zichron Brit LeRishonim, naming occurs at the Brit with a different formula than the standard Brit Milah. The more common practice among Ashkenazic Jews follows Rabbi Moshe Feinstein, with naming occurring at immersion.

Where the procedure was performed but not followed by immersion or other requirements of the conversion procedure (e.g., in Conservative Judaism, where the mother has not converted), if the boy chooses to complete the conversion at Bar Mitzvah, a milah l'shem giur performed when the boy was an infant removes the obligation to undergo either a full brit milah or hatafat dam brit.

Controlling male sexuality 
The desire to control male sexuality has been central to Milah throughout history. Jewish theologians, philosophers, and ethicists have often justified the practice by claiming that the ritual substantially reduces male sexual pleasure and desire.

The political scientist Thomas Pangle concluded:As Maimonides — the greatest legal scholar, and also the preeminent medical authority, in traditional Judaism — teaches, the most obvious purpose of circumcision is the weakening of the male sexual capacity and pleasure... Closely related would appear to be the aim of setting before any potential adult male convert the trial of submitting to a mark that incurs shame among most if not all other peoples, as well as being frighteningly painful: "Now a man does not perform this act upon himself or upon a son of his unless it be in consequence of a genuine belief... Finally, this mark, and the gulf it establishes, not only distinguishes but unifies the chosen people. The peculiar nature of the pain, of the debility, and of the shame serves to underline the fact that dedication to God calls for a severe mastery over and ruthless subordination of sexual appetite and pleasure. It is surely no accident, Maimonides observes in the same passage just quoted, it was the chaste Abraham who was the first to be called upon to enact ritual circumcision. But of course we must add since the commandment applies to Ishmael as well as to Issac, circumcision is the mark uniting those singular peoples, descended from Abraham, who recall not only his chastity but above all his dread in the presence of God; who share in that dread, and who understand the dread and the circumcision to be in part their response as mortal, hence reproductive, hence sexual creatures — created in the image of God — to the presence of the holy or pure God Who as Creator utterly transcends His mortal, reproductive creatures, and especially their sexuality. The Jewish philosopher Philo Judaeus argued that Milah is a way to "mutilate the organ" in order to eliminate "all superfluous and excessive pleasure."
Similarly, while not claiming that circumcision limited sexual pleasure, Maimonides proposed that two important purposes of circumcision are to temper sexual desire and to join in an affirmation of faith and the covenant of Abraham:

Visible symbol of a covenant 
Rabbi Saadia Gaon considers something to be "complete" if it lacks nothing, but also has nothing that is unneeded. He regards the foreskin an unneeded organ that God created in man, and so by amputating it, the man is completed. The author of Sefer ha-Chinuch provides three reasons for the practice of circumcision:
 To complete the form of man, by removing what he claims to be a redundant organ;
 To mark the chosen people, so that their bodies will be different as their souls are. The organ chosen for the mark is the one responsible for the sustenance of the species.
 The completion effected by circumcision is not congenital, but left to the man. This implies that as he completes the form of his body, so can he complete the form of his soul.

Talmud professor Daniel Boyarin offered two explanations for circumcision. One is that it is a literal inscription on the Jewish body of the name of God in the form of the letter "yud" (from "yesod"). The second is that the act of bleeding represents a feminization of Jewish men, significant in the sense that the covenant represents a marriage between Jews and (a symbolically male) God.

Other reasons 
In Of the Special Laws, Book 1, the Jewish philosopher Philo additionally gave other reasons for the practice of circumcision.

He attributes four of the reasons to "men of divine spirit and wisdom."  These include the idea that circumcision:
 Protects against disease,
 Secures cleanliness "in a way that is suited to the people consecrated to God,"
 Causes the circumcised portion of the penis to resemble a heart, thereby representing a physical connection between the "breath contained within the heart [that] is generative of thoughts, and the generative organ itself [that] is productive of living beings," and
 Promotes prolificness by removing impediments to the flow of semen."Is a symbol of a man's knowing himself."

Judaism, Christianity, and the Early Church (4 BCE – 150 CE) 

The 1st-century Jewish author Philo Judaeus defended Jewish circumcision on several grounds. He thought that circumcision should be done as early as possible as it would not be as likely to be done by someone's own free will. He claimed that the foreskin prevented semen from reaching the vagina and so should be done as a way to increase the nation's population. He also noted that circumcision should be performed as an effective means to reduce sexual pleasure.

There was also division in Pharisaic Judaism between Hillel the Elder and Shammai on the issue of circumcision of proselytes.

According to the Gospel of Luke, Jesus was circumcised on the 8th day.

According to saying 53 of the Gospel of Thomas,

Foreskin was considered a sign of beauty, civility, and masculinity throughout the Greco-Roman world; it was custom to spend an hour a day or so exercising nude in the gymnasium and in Roman baths; many Jewish men did not want to be seen in public deprived of their foreskins, where matters of business and politics were discussed. To expose one's glans in public was seen as indecent, vulgar, and a sign of sexual arousal and desire.

Classical, Hellenistic, and Roman culture widely found circumcision to be barbaric, cruel, and utterly repulsive in nature. By the period of the Maccabees, many Jewish men attempted to hide their circumcisions through the process of epispasm due to the circumstances of the period, although Jewish religious writers denounced these practices as abrogating the covenant of Abraham in 1 Maccabees and the Talmud. After Christianity and Second Temple Judaism split apart from one another, Milah was declared spiritually unnecessary as a condition of justification by Christian writers such as Paul the Apostle and subsequently in the Council of Jerusalem, while it further increased in importance for Jews.

In the mid-2nd century CE, the Tannaim, the successors of the newly ideologically dominant Pharisees, introduced and made mandatory a secondary step of circumcision known as the Periah. Without it circumcision was newly declared to have no spiritual value. This new form removed as much of the inner mucosa as possible, the frenulum and its corresponding delta from the penis, and prevented the movement of shaft skin, in what creates a "low and tight" circumcision. It was intended to make it impossible to restore the foreskin. This is the form practiced among the large majority of Jews today, and, later, became a basis for the routine neonatal circumcisions performed in the United States.

The steps, justifications, and imposition of the practice have dramatically varied throughout history; commonly cited reasons for the practice have included it being a way to control male sexuality by reducing sexual pleasure and desire, as a visual marker of the covenant of the pieces, as a metaphor for mankind perfecting creation, and as a means to promote fertility. The original version in Judaic history was either a ritual nick or cut done by a father to the acroposthion, the part of the foreskin that overhangs the glans penis. This form of genital nicking or cutting, known as simply milah, became adopted among Jews by the Second Temple period and was the predominant form until the second century CE. The notion of milah being linked to a biblical covenant is generally believed to have originated in the 6th century BCE as a product of the Babylonian captivity; the practice likely lacked this significance among Jews before the period.

Reform Judaism 
The Reform societies established in Frankfurt and Berlin regarded circumcision as barbaric and wished to abolish it. However, while prominent rabbis such as Abraham Geiger believed the ritual to be barbaric and outdated, they refrained from instituting any change in this matter. In 1843, when a father in Frankfurt refused to circumcise his son, rabbis of all shades in Germany stated it was mandated by Jewish law; even Samuel Holdheim affirmed this. By 1871, Reform rabbinic leadership in Germany reasserted "the supreme importance of circumcision in Judaism," while affirming the traditional viewpoint that non-circumcised Jews are Jews nonetheless. Although the issue of circumcision of converts continues to be debated, the necessity of Brit Milah for Jewish infant boys has been stressed in every subsequent Reform rabbis manual or guide. Since 1984 Reform Judaism has trained and certified over 300 of their own practicing mohalim in this ritual.

In Samaritanism 
Samaritan brit milah occurs on the eighth day following the child's birth at the father's home. In addition to special prayers and readings from the Torah pertaining to the ritual, an old hymn that invokes blessings for parents and children is sung.

According to 19th century British explorer Conder, in their circumcision hymn, Samaritans express their gratitude for a certain Roman soldier by the name of Germon, who was sent by an unknown Roman Emperor as a sentinel over the home of the Samaritan High Priest for his kindness in allowing the process of circumcision to take place. They tried to give him money, but he refused, just requesting to be included in their future prayers instead.

Criticism and legality

Criticism

Among Jews 
A growing number of contemporary Jews have chosen not to circumcise their sons.

Among the reasons for their choice is the claim that circumcision is a form of bodily and sexual harm forced on men and violence against helpless infants, a violation of children's rights, and their opinion that circumcision is a dangerous, unnecessary, painful, traumatic and stressful event for the child, which can cause even further psychophysical complications down the road, including serious disability and even death.  They are assisted by a number of Reform, Liberal, and Reconstructionist rabbis, and have developed a welcoming ceremony that they call the Brit shalom ("Covenant [of] Peace") for such children, also accepted by Humanistic Judaism. The ceremony of Brit shalom is not officially approved of by the Reform or Reconstructionist rabbinical organizations, who make the recommendation that male infants should be circumcised, though the issue of converts remains controversial and circumcision of converts is not mandatory in either movement.

The connection of the Reform movement to an anti-circumcision, pro-symbolic stance is a historical one. From the early days of the movement in Germany and Eastern Europe, some classical Reformers hoped to replace ritual circumcision "with a symbolic act, as has been done for other bloody practices, such as the sacrifices". In the US, an official Reform resolution in 1893 announced converts are no longer mandated to undergo the ritual, and this ambivalence toward the practice has carried over to classical-minded Reform Jews today. In Elyse Wechterman's essay A Plea for Inclusion, she argues that, even in the absence of circumcision, committed Jews should never be turned away, especially by a movement "where no other ritual observance is mandated." She goes on to advocate an alternate covenant ceremony, for both boys and girls as a welcoming ritual into Judaism. With a continuing negativity towards circumcision still present within a minority of modern-day Reform, Judaic scholar Jon Levenson has warned that if they "continue to judge brit milah to be not only medically unnecessary but also brutalizing and mutilating ... the abhorrence of it expressed by some early Reform leaders will return with a vengeance", proclaiming that circumcision will be "the latest front in the battle over the Jewish future in America".

Many European Jewish fathers during the nineteenth century chose not to circumcise their sons, including Theodor Herzl. However, unlike many other forms of religious observance, it remained one of the last rituals Jewish communities could enforce. In most of Europe, both the government and the unlearned Jewish masses believed circumcision to be a rite akin to baptism, and the law allowed communities not to register uncircumcised children as Jewish. This legal maneuver spurred several debates addressing the advisibility of its use, since many parents later chose to convert to Christianity. In early 20th-century Russia, Chaim Soloveitchik advised his colleagues to reject this measure, stating that uncircumcised Jewish males are no less Jewish than Jews who violate other commandments. Since the 18th century, multiple Jewish philosophers and theologians have criticized the practice of circumcision, advocating an abolishment of the practice and alternatives such as Brit Shalom. Circumcision rates are near-universal among Jews.

Brit shalom ("Covenant of Peace"), also called alternative brit, brit ben, brit chayim, brit tikkun, or bris in Yiddish and Ashkenazi Hebrew, refers to a range of newly created naming ceremonies for self-identified Jewish families that involve rejecting the traditional Jewish rite of circumcision. There is no universally agreed upon form of Brit Shalom. Brit shalom ceremonies are performed by a rabbi or a lay person; in this context, rabbi does not necessarily imply belief in God, as some celebrants belong to Humanistic Judaism. Brit shalom is recognized by secular Jewish organizations affiliated with Humanistic Judaism like the International Institute for Secular Humanistic Judaism, Congress of Secular Jewish Organizations, and Society for Humanistic Judaism.

The actual number of brit shalom ceremonies performed per year is unknown.  Filmmaker Eli Ungar-Sargon, who is opposed to circumcision, said in 2011, regarding its current popularity, that "calling it a marginal phenomenon would be generous." Its popularity in the United States, where it has been promoted by groups such as Beyond the Bris and Jews Against Circumcision, is increasing, however. The first known ceremony was celebrated by Rabbi Sherwin Wine, the founder of the Society for Humanistic Judaism, around 1970.

Outside Jews 
In 2017, Iceland proposed a bill banning circumcision especially for non-medical reasons, with a six-year jail term for anyone carrying out a circumcision for non-medical reasons, as well as anyone guilty of removing a child's sexual organs in whole or in part, arguing that the practice violates the child's rights. Religious groups have condemned the bill because it goes against their traditions.

See also 
 Circumcision of Jesus
 Khitan (circumcision)
 History of male circumcision

References

External links 

 Chabad.org's Brit Milah: The Covenant of Circumcision
 Jewish Encyclopedia's entry for Circumcision
 Jewish Virtual Library's Circumcision – Brit Milah
 CircCentral, an online museum of Brit Milah instruments

Circumcision
Jewish life cycle
Jewish medical ethics
Judaism and children
Judaism-related controversies
Lech-Lecha
Positive Mitzvoth
Rites of passage
Hebrew words and phrases in Jewish law
Talmud concepts and terminology